Belfast is a rural municipality in Prince Edward Island, Canada. It is located in southeastern Queens County in the townships of Lot 57 and Lot 58.

Situated on the island's south shore along the Northumberland Strait, Belfast is predominantly an agricultural area.

History 
Belfast was the landing site of Lord Selkirk's settlers in 1803. These poor displaced Scottish farmers soon established themselves on the best land in the area and it became one of the most productive farming districts in the colony. Until very recently, the area around Belfast was Canadian Gaelic-speaking and added many important works of poetry to Scottish Gaelic literature.

The Presbyterian Scots were joined in the mid-19th century by displaced Irish Great Famine refugees who were forced to take poorer land in surrounding areas. Political, social and religious tensions between the Catholic Irish and the Presbyterian Scottish Gaels boiled over during a general election in March 1847, resulting in what has become known as the Belfast Riot.

In 1917, Rev. Murdoch Lamont (1865-1927), a Gaelic-speaking Presbyterian minister from nearby Orwell, Queens County, Prince Edward Island, published a small, vanity press booklet titled, An Cuimhneachain: Òrain Céilidh Gàidheal Cheap Breatuinn agus Eilean-an-Phrionnsa ("The Remembrance: Céilidh Songs of the Cape Breton and Prince Edward Island Gaels") in Quincy, Massachusetts. In Rev. Lamont's pamphlet and due to his meticulous work as a collector, the most complete versions survive of the Canadian Gaelic oral poetry composed upon Prince Edward Island before the loss of the language there, including the 1803 song-poem Òran an Imrich ("The Song of Emigration") by Selkirk settler Calum Bàn MacMhannain (Malcolm Buchanan) and Òran le Ruaraidh Mór MacLeoid by Ruaraidh Mór Belfast, (Roderick MacLeod), both of whom were born on the Isle of Skye, but emigrated to the Belfast district.

Demographics 

Economy 
One of the region's major employers is Northumberland Ferries, which operates a terminal in Wood Islands. This ferry service, which connects Prince Edward Island to Caribou, Nova Scotia, was first established in 1941.

Attractions 
Belfast's major recreational component to their community include, Belfast Rec Center which includes one ice surface, a community room, a canteen & a skate sharpening service; Belfast Highland Greens, a 9-hole golf course, Belfast Community Pool which includes two outdoor pools, a kiddy pool and canteen services, as well as a softball field beside the rink. Belfast is also home to a community-operated campground at Lord Selkirk Provincial Park.

Also of interest is the lighthouse at nearby Point Prim, which was designed by Architect Isaac Smith in 1845 (notable for designing Province House (Prince Edward Island))  and is the oldest lighthouse on the Island. The 18.2 m (60 foot) structure is also the only round brick lighthouse on PEI and one of the last of its kind in Canada.

On the road to Point Prim Lighthouse is Hannah's Bottle Village, a local tourist attraction made up of several miniature buildings constructed of glass bottles and cement. There is no admission charge, but donations to the IWK Health Centre in Halifax are accepted.

Of particular note is the local parish church, St. John's. Built in 1824 in the style of Sir Christopher Wren, Saint John's is today under the pastoral care of Rev. Roger W.MacPhee. In 2005, the church invited Robin Mark, a popular Christian musician from Belfast, Northern Ireland, to lead their "Emerging Church Conference." The E.C.C. was such a success that Mr. Mark returned in 2006 for "Revival in Belfast II" and was scheduled to be back in 2007 along with Pastor Paul Reid.  Saint John's has the largest Presbyterian Sunday school east of Montreal.

In addition to Saint John's, Belfast is home to two other churches, namely, Saint Michael's Roman Catholic, and Wood Islands Presbyterian. Many residents of the community attend worship services in Charlottetown or Montague.

Education 
Students in the area attend Belfast Consolidated School. From grade 10 through grade 12, they attend Montague Regional High School. Both schools are administered by P.E.I.'s English Language School Board.

Politics 
Belfast is part of the provincial electoral district of Belfast-Murray River. Currently the Member of the Legislative Assembly of Prince Edward Island is Progressive Conservative Darlene Compton.

Notable people 
Notable "Belfasters" include former P.E.I. premier John Angus MacLean (d. 2000).

Dr. Angus MacAulay, b. 10 Dec. 1759, a lay preacher and medical doctor, was instrumental in helping to establish the first church (a log structure) in 1804. Macaulay was thus easily elected to the House of Assembly in 1806 as a representative of Queens County. When Lieutenant Governor Smith called for elections to a new assembly in 1818, Macaulay was returned from Queens County, and was an active speaker of the house government. Elected again in 1820, Macaulay was once more chosen speaker when the house convened in July. Macaulay stood by his people publicly and privately for more than a quarter of a century. He gave a plot of his own land in Point Prim for a cemetery (where he buried his own daughter). The Polly Cemetery is still used by locals today in the community of Belfast. d. 6 Dec. 1827.

Dougald MacKinnon (December 15, 1886 – August 21, 1970) was a farmer, fisherman and political figure on Prince Edward Island. He represented 4th Queens in the Legislative Assembly of Prince Edward Island from 1935 to 1959 as a Liberal. He was known for  repeatedly working for his constituent. As a people person he was well regarded in the community of Belfast. He served in the province's Executive Council. His portfolio included Minister of Public Works and Highways, Minister of Industry and Natural Resources and was the first Minister of Fisheries for the Province of PEI. He was also involved in the local Belfast Historical Society and served as President of The St Andrew's Society.

The members of the band Paper Lions come from Belfast.

Communities 

The Community of Belfast was incorporated in 1972 and contains the following localities or settlements:

 Belfast
 Melville
 Iona
 Culloden
 Eldon
 Flat River
 Fodhla
 Garfield
 Lower Newtown
 Mount Buchanan
 Mount Vernon
 Pinette
 Roseberry
 Valley
 Surrey
 Belle River
 Wood Islands
 Point Prim

References

Sources

External links 
Official website

Canadian Gaelic
Communities in Queens County, Prince Edward Island
Rural municipalities in Prince Edward Island